The Dryadaulinae are a subfamily of moth of the family Tineidae.

Genera
 Brachydoxa
 Dryadaula Meyrick, 1893

References